Lake Salvador is a  lake about  southwest of New Orleans, Louisiana, in Jefferson, Lafourche, and St. Charles parishes. The lake has had multiple names. On the d'Anville map of 1732, the lake was Lac des Ounchas. The Darby map of 1816 lists the lake as Ouacha Lake and other times it was spelled Ouachas Lake. Finally, on the Cram map of 1916, the lake was both Lake Ouache and Salvador.

The lake is fed by Bayou Des Allemands then flows into the Gulf of Mexico. Lake Salvador is surrounded by swamp and offer a habitat for catfish, bass, and red drum.

Young bull sharks have been known to prefer low-salinity or brackish water, and in 2015 one was found in the lake. A Louisiana Department of Wildlife and Fisheries Marine Fisheries Biologist stated that bull sharks are one of the more aggressive shark species worldwide. Biologist manager Shane Granier stated, "It’s not necessarily a common occurrence, but it’s not unheard of [to find sharks in the lake.]"

See also
List of lakes of the United States

References

Estuaries of Louisiana
Salvador
Bodies of water of Jefferson Parish, Louisiana
Bodies of water of Lafourche Parish, Louisiana
Bodies of water of St. Charles Parish, Louisiana
Tourist attractions in St. Charles Parish, Louisiana